Delmues was a non-agency station on the Pioche branch of the Union Pacific railroad located in Lincoln County, in the U.S. state of Nevada.

Name variations included Delmue, Delmues Station and Engadine.

History
The community was named after Joseph D. Delmue, who operated a ranch at the site in the 1870s.

During the Great Depression, a Civilian Conservation Corp was located at Delmues ranch.

References

Ghost towns in Lincoln County, Nevada